This is a list of notable writers who come from India or have Indian nationality. Names are sorted according to surname.

A

B

C

D

E

F

G

H

I

J

K

L

M

N

P

Q

R

S

T

U

V

W

Y

References 

Lists of Indian writers